Sir Robert Frankland-Russell, 7th Baronet (1784–1849) was an English politician, known also as an artist. In early life he was called Robert Frankland.

Life
He was the son of Sir Thomas Frankland, 6th Baronet and his wife Dorothy, daughter of William Smelt. He studied at Christ Church, Oxford.

He succeeded his father as baronet in 1831, and in 1836 inherited property from Sir Robert Greenhill-Russell, 1st Baronet, adding Russell to his surname. The estate included Chequers Court, which he improved, with Edward Buckton Lamb brought in as architect. He was High Sheriff of Yorkshire in 1838.

After her husband's death, Lady Frankland-Russell commissioned his friend Lamb to redesign All Saints parish church at Thirkleby, near the family seat Thirkleby Hall, in his memory.

Works
Frankland-Russell's father had studied under John Malchair, and he himself was a watercolourist, and painted hunting scenes. Two series of aquatints by Charles Turner after Frankland appeared in 1814, Delights of Fishing and Hunting Subjects.

Family
Frankland married in 1815 Louisa-Anne Murray, third daughter of Lord George Murray. They had five daughters. On the 7th baronet's death, the title passed to his cousin Frederick William Franklin.

The daughters were:

Augusta-Louisa, who married Thomas de Grey, 5th Baron Walsingham in 1842, and was mother of Thomas de Grey, 6th Baron Walsingham, dying in 1844
Caroline-Agnes (d. 18 May 1846)
Emily-Anne, who married Sir William Payne-Gallwey, 2nd Baronet in 1847
Julia-Roberta, who married Ralph Neville
Rosalind-Alicia, who married Francis L'Estrange Astley, son of Sir Jacob Astley, 5th Baronet, in 1854 as his second wife.

Notes

External links

1784 births
1849 deaths
Baronets in the Baronetage of England
Members of the Parliament of the United Kingdom for English constituencies
English watercolourists
UK MPs 1812–1818
UK MPs 1818–1820
UK MPs 1820–1826
UK MPs 1826–1830
UK MPs 1830–1831
UK MPs 1831–1832
UK MPs 1832–1835
Robert
High Sheriffs of Yorkshire